DRL (formerly DoomRL), short for Doom, the Roguelike, is a roguelike video game developed by ChaosForge based on the first-person shooters Doom and Doom II. It has been in development since 2002, and was released for Microsoft Windows, Linux and OS X. Following a cease and desist notice from "Doom" trademark owner ZeniMax Media, the game's name was changed to DRL in 2016.

Gameplay 
DRL is turn-based, offers a top-down interface formed entirely of ASCII characters, and features a character leveling system with traits. As it is based upon Doom, the game is more fast-paced and combat-oriented than usual for a roguelike, and relies heavily on ranged rather than melee combat. A limited player inventory, non-stackable items, and other design choices contrast with the often extreme intricacy of games in its genre.

As of version 0.9.9.6, Derek Yu's graphical tileset is now the game's default, offering an alternative to the more traditional ASCII rendering. DRL includes the entire Doom soundset and music library, with optional support for high-quality MP3s.

History

Development 
The game was created by programmer Kornel Kisielewicz with Free Pascal, and uses art by Derek Yu. The developers based DRL in the popular first-person shooters Doom and Doom II universe.
Since approximately 2002 in-development with first beta versions, the latest stable release is from 2013.

Wordmark conflict 
On December 2, 2016, Kisielewicz received a cease and desist notice from ZeniMax Media, concerning the use of the wordmark "Doom" present on game's website and name, which ZeniMax trademarked worldwide. To exclude "Doom" from the game's name, the title was changed to simply DRL on December 7, 2016.

Open sourcing 
In addition, the game was made open source by Kisielewicz on December 6, 2016. Kisielewicz had planned on releasing DoomRL as open-source prior to receiving the notice at the conclusion of an ongoing crowdfunding campaign on Kickstarter for Jupiter Hell, a sequel to DoomRL using the same assets, as a thank-you to his supporters. The notice only made him push up this change to an earlier date. The source code was made available via GitHub under GPL 2.0 or later and the game's assets under the CC BY-SA 4.0 license. Kisielewicz anticipates that the open-source community will be able to provide support and improvements to enhance both DRL and Jupiter Hell. For instance, a community source port of DRL to the OpenPandora handheld resulted already three days later.

Reception 
In 2014 DRL was described by PCGamer as "a brilliant mashup of two classics" and named among the "Ten top fan remade classics you can play for free right now".

References

External links 

 
 Official source code page on github.com

Doom (franchise)
Linux games
Roguelike video games
Windows games
Open-source video games
Free software programmed in Pascal
Freeware games
Fangames
Creative Commons-licensed video games